is a member of the Supreme Court of Japan who was Vice Foreign Minister.

References

Supreme Court of Japan justices
Ambassadors of Japan to Indonesia
1943 births
Living people
People from Nara Prefecture
Kyoto University alumni